Bilhete de Identidade (Portuguese for "identity ticket") may refer to:
Bilhete de Identidade de Residente (Macau)
Bilhete de identidade (Mozambique)
Bilhete de Identidade (Portugal)